Brovarskyi prospect is a arterial and the longest public roadway in Kyiv, Ukraine. It stretches from the Kyiv Metro Bridge over Dnieper to the city of Brovary.

The roadway was created in the second half of the 20th century (1973), previously known as Brovarske highway (chaussee).

Most of the roadway is part of the  main route (except for the segment between Metro Bridge and vulytsia Bratyslavska). Along the prospect are located several overpasses and bridges. There are also five metro stations of the Sviatoshynsko–Brovarska line as well as couple of railway stations.

From the Metro Bridge it passes Livoberezhnyi Masyv, continues between Lisovyi Masyv on north side and Kyiv Sotsmisto with Kyiv Radykal Factory on south side before it dives into Bykivnia Forest that separates Brovary from Kyiv. Within the Bykivnia Forest, prospect passes an oscillated residential community Bykivnia, better known for its Bykivnia Graves memorial park, and a bird farm "Kyivska".

Before the 20th century it existed as the road that was stretching east of the Nicholas Chain Bridge passing through Mykilska Slobidka (Nicholas Village) continuing through big Bykivnia Forest towards Brovary. On the maps of 19th century Bykivnia Forest occupied bigger territories over today's "Lisovyi Masyv" and "Sotsmisto".

External links 
Brovarskyi prospect (Броварський проспект). Kyiv Web Encyclopaedia.  

Streets in Kyiv